Alexis Pauline Gumbs is an American writer, independent scholar, poet, activist and educator based in Durham, North Carolina.

Biography
Gumbs holds a PhD in English, African and African-American Studies, and Women and Gender Studies from Duke University.

Gumbs was the Winton Chair in the Liberal Arts in the Department of Theater Arts and Dance at the University of Minnesota (2017–2019). Gumbs is the Founder and Director of Eternal Summer of the Black Feminist Mind and founder of BrokenBeautiful Press. She is the dramaturge for "dat Black Mermaid Man Lady", a performance by Sharon Bridgforth.

Gumbs has spent the majority of her career as an independent writer and scholar outside of formal academic institutions. Gumbs teaches online seminars, writes blog posts, and runs webinars through her website Brilliance Remastered. Because she does not work at a university, she has participated in conversations about how intellectual work can be more path breaking and widely accessible outside of the academy.

Works

Books
Spill: Scenes of Black Feminist Fugitivity (2017)
M Archive: After the End of the World (2018) 
DUB: Finding Ceremony (2020)
Undrowned: Black Feminist Lessons from Marine Mammals (2020)

Edited volumes
Revolutionary Mothering: Love on the Frontlines (2016) – co-editor with Mai’a Williams and China Martens. This book focuses on the activity of mothering.

Documentaries
The Revival: Women and the Word

References

1982 births
Living people
American feminist writers
Barnard College alumni
21st-century American women writers
American women poets
Duke University alumni
Duke University faculty
21st-century American poets
American women academics